The 1961 Campeonato Brasileiro Série A (officially the 1961 Taça Brasil) was the 3rd edition of the Campeonato Brasileiro Série A. It began on July 12, 1961, and ended on December  27, 1961. Santos were crowned champions after beating Bahia in the final, drawing 1–1 in the home leg before winning 5–1 in the away leg.

Format 
The competition was a single elimination knockout tournament featuring two-legged ties, with a Tie-Break (play-off) if the sides were tied on points (however, if the tie-break was a draw, the aggregate score of the first two legs was used to determine the winner).

Teams 
17 state champions qualified, along with the 1960 Taça Brasil champions, Palmeiras.

Northern Zone

Northeastern Group

Northern Group

Northern Zone Final

Southern Zone

Southern Group

Eastern Group

Southern Zone Final

National Semi-Finals
Santos and Náutico entered at this stage.

National Final

References

External links
 1961 Taça Brasil

Brazil
1961 in Brazilian football
Taça Brasil seasons
B